Kepookalani was a High Chief during the founding of the Kingdom of Hawaii.
Two of his grandchildren would marry each other, and two of his great-grandchildren would be the last two ruling monarchs of the Kingdom.

Life
Kepookalani was born around 1760. His mother was Kamakaeheikuli and father was Kameeiamoku.
He was half-cousin of Kamehameha I, and named after the only full brother of Kamehameha usually called Keliimaikai or Keapo o Kepookalani. His notable half-brothers (with different mothers) were Hoolulu and Ulumāheihei Hoapili who both became close advisors to Kamehameha and were trusted to aid in his burial.
In the Hawaiian language, ke po'o ka lani means "the royal leader".
He married his cousin Chiefess Alapai Wahine and they had a son Kamanawa II (c. 1785–1840) and another son Kapelakapuokakae.
Kamanawa was named after the Kamanawa who was a twin of Kepookalani's father. Often he is called Kamanawa Ōpio or Elua because ōpio means "junior" and elua means "second" in  Hawaiian.
Kamanawa was convicted of the murder of his wife in 1840 and executed.

Kepookalani also married High Chiefess Keohohiwa and had son Aikanaka (c. 1790–1868), a child named Kalailua, and then married a Chiefess named Nune (spelled Nenew in some sources) and had a daughter named Piianaia.

Kamanawa's son Caesar Kapaakea (1815–1866) would marry Aikanaka's daughter Analea Keohokālole. They were half-cousins, since they shared only a grandfather, with different grandmothers. Their children were called the House of Kalākaua, including the last two ruling monarchs of the Kingdom: King David Kalākaua (1836–1891) and Queen Liliuokalani (1839–1893).  Kepookalani was their "double great-grandfather" or "great-grandfather from both sides". This kind of family background was a desirable way to enhance the royal bloodlines at the time, but was attacked by the conservative missionaries later in the 19th century as incest.
Even some of the other royals snubbed Kalākaua and did not congratulate him when he came to the throne in 1874.

The Isaac Hale Beach Park on the island of Hawaii was named for a descendant who lived in the area named Isaac Kepookalani Hale.

Family tree

References

1760s births
19th-century deaths
Royalty of the Hawaiian Kingdom